The Sylvers were an American R&B family vocal group from Watts, Los Angeles, California. The Sylvers were a popular act during the 1970s, recording the hit singles "Fool's Paradise", "Boogie Fever", and "Hot Line". Prior to becoming the  Sylvers, the four eldest members (Olympia, Leon, Charmaine, and James) recorded as the Little Angels, appearing on shows such as You Bet Your Life and Make Room for Daddy, and opening for such acts as Johnny Mathis and Ray Charles. During this time, they released two singles: "Santa Claus Parade" b/w "I'll Be a Little Angel" on Warwick Records and "Says You" b/w "Olympia" on Capitol Records.

Background

Members
The Sylvers family consisted of ten siblings, nine of whom performed in the band at one point or another:
 Olympia Ann "Olan" Sylvers (born October 13, 1951) — vocals
 Leon Frank Sylvers III (born March 7, 1953) — bass, vocals
 Charmaine Elaine Sylvers (born March 9, 1954) — vocals
 James Jonathan Sylvers (born June 8, 1955) — keyboards, vocals
 Edmund Theodore Sylvers (January 25, 1957 — March 11, 2004) — vocals, percussion
 Joseph Richard "Ricky" Sylvers (born October 13, 1958) — guitar, vocals
 Angelia Marie "Angie" Sylvers (born April 11, 1960) — vocals
 Patricia Lynn "Pat" Sylvers (born March 25, 1961) — additional keyboards, vocals
 Foster Emerson Sylvers (born February 25, 1962) — additional bass, vocals

The tenth and youngest Sylvers sibling, Christopher Joseph Sylvers (1966–1985), never performed with the group.

Career
Shirley Mae Wyble and Leon Frank "Sonny" Sylvers married after meeting at Xavier University of Louisiana. They had ten children, and taught them to play music, sing and dance. Olympia "Olan", Leon and Charmaine, performed as the Little Angels, choosing mainly Caribbean Calypso–styled soul music. They appeared in several variety shows, charity shows, community events, and other public venues. One of the earliest events promoting the Sylvers was when the whole family appeared on the quiz game show "You Bet Your Life" with Groucho Marx. Soon after, Jonathan "James" joined the group, and the four of them continued to perform, gaining slight success. Appearing in several television shows, and media appearances. In the mid-1960s, they released recordings on Capitol Records.

In the late 1960s, they added Edmund and Joseph Richard "Ricky" to the group. After signing a recording contract with MGM, the sextet changed their name from the Little Angels to the Sylvers and released three albums on the MGM/Pride label, titled simply The Sylvers, The Sylvers 2, and The Sylvers 3. Released between 1972 and 1974, these LPs offered soulful numbers written by Leon and produced by Jerry Butler (of the Impressions) and Keg Johnson. Four singles from these self-titled albums entered the Billboard R&B charts. The song "Fool's Paradise" reached number 14 on the R&B charts in the autumn of 1972. The single featured Charmaine, Edmund, and Ricky as lead singers, backed by the harmonies of Olympia, Leon, and James.

"Wish That I Could Talk to You" was the next single. During early 1973 it became the siblings' first top 10 song. The track features Leon, Edmund, and Ricky on lead. The two-sided hit "Stay Away From Me" (#33) and "I'll Never Be Ashamed", as well as "Through the Love in My Heart" (#50), followed; and album track "Cry of a Dreamer" received significant airplay at R&B radio outlets.

In early 1973, Leon wrote an uptempo disco song called "Misdemeanor" for the group's second album. However, the lead vocal, sung by Edmund, was later reassigned to younger brother Foster, who was not an official member of the Sylvers at this time. The song also featured younger Sylvers Angie and Pat, and received airplay on R&B radio stations. This song would later become popular in the late 1980s and 1990s when it was sampled by  rapper/producer Dr. Dre for a song by the D.O.C. entitled "It's Funky Enough". 

After the success of "Misdemeanor", Foster, Angie, and Pat quickly joined their older brothers and sisters to the official Sylvers group, (upping the total members to nine), and signed an exclusive contract with Capitol Records, the same label they recorded for as the Little Angels. The label teamed the family with R&B producer Freddie Perren (the Jackson 5). Perren, with co-writer Keni St. Lewis, produced the two-million seller "Boogie Fever" which topped the R&B and Billboard Hot 100 charts, along with the RPM national singles chart.

Those two tracks were included on the first Capitol album with Perren. It was titled Showcase and featured rotating lead singers on songs written by both Perren and St. Lewis, as well as Leon Sylvers. Capitol followed up "Boogie Fever" with the bubble-gum confection "Cotton Candy". The group began playing their own instruments for certain live performances, with Ricky on guitar, James on piano, Edmund on drums, and Leon on bass guitar. In 1976, following the recording of their next album, Something Special, Charmaine, one of the original Little Angels, left the group. Something Special was the family's biggest-selling LP, reaching 13 on the Billboard album charts. Produced by Perren, the LP spawned another smash million-seller, "Hot Line" (#5 on Billboard Hot 100), as well as "High School Dance" (#17 on Billboard Hot 100). These two singles firmly entrenched the siblings' popular sound in the bubble-gum, teeny-bopper demographic.

In an effort to reach a wider, more mature R&B audience, the Sylvers (now seven in number following Olympia's retirement to have children) opted not to re-team with Perren in the summer of 1977 and began writing and producing for themselves. Despite positive reviews, the resulting album, New Horizons, was a commercial disappointment, peaking at #43 on the Billboard album charts and spawning two short-lived singles: "Any Way You Want Me" and the title track. The family went right back into the studio to record their next album, this time with Leon producing. Capitol did not like the new sound and rejected the album. The Sylvers shopped the material elsewhere and by mid-1978 had signed with Casablanca Records. At the same time Leon was recruited by record executive Dick Griffey to become the in-house producer for a new label he had started with Soul Train impresario Don Cornelius. With the family's new album already complete and his brothers and sisters now signed with Casablanca, Leon left the group to write and produce for such Solar Records artists as Shalamar, the Whispers, Lakeside, Carrie Lucas and Dynasty (of which he was a group member).

In the meantime, in June 1978, Casablanca released the album Capitol had rejected. Forever Yours included the lead single "Don't Stop, Get Off" (#15 R&B), a song on which Leon shared lead with Edmund. James performed Leon's parts in performances, while Foster replaced Leon as the bassist. The album's title track followed as a second single but failed to chart. With Leon under contract at Solar, and the remaining six Sylvers still under contract to Casablanca, the label teamed the group with the Oscar-winning disco composer Giorgio Moroder (Midnight Express, Donna Summer). The result, released in the summer of 1979, was the aptly titled album Disco Fever. The first single was a discofied remake of Diana Ross' "Mahogany" but failed to chart like its follow-up single "Hoochie Coochie Dancin'". "Have You Heard", a solo effort from Edmund, who had sung lead on many of the family's bigger hits, was released on Casablanca in the summer of 1980. "That Burning Love" (#38 R&B/#90 Pop) was the sole single to chart from the effort. Also that year, Charmaine recorded a solo single of sorts, doing the vocal work on Gene Page's disco classic "Love Starts After Dark". The Sylvers appeared in the 1979 film The Fish That Saved Pittsburgh.

Solo careers
As the world's appetite for dance music waned in the early 1980s, so did the Sylvers' popularity. In 1981, five members of the group, now without Edmund, recorded a new album Concept for Solar Records, with Leon producing and playing bass but not performing vocally. The first single from that effort, "Come Back Lover, Come Back" (featuring a now grown-up Foster on lead) was a minor hit, reaching #63 in Billboard. "Take It to the Top" failed to chart; but both singles appear on the Solar Records retrospective box set.

In 1984, after a three-year hiatus, the siblings (now six strong, with Charmaine returning) regrouped with new management (Weisner–DeMann) and a new label (Geffen Records). The result was an unsuccessful album entitled Bizarre. The disc was not heavily promoted, but spawned two minor hits: "In One Love and Out the Other" (#42) and "Falling For Your Love" (#76).

The Sylvers' youngest sibling, Christopher, died of hepatitis on June 18, 1985, at age 18. He was never part of the performing family. Following the disappointing sales performance of the Geffen LP, the brothers and sisters officially disbanded in 1985. They would continue to do studio work, playing and singing background vocals for artists including Janet Jackson. Edmund recorded a solo album for Arista in 1985, but it was never released in the United States, although a single from the set, "I Love the Streets", was released in Japan in 1989. Foster started his own group, Hy-Tech, in 1989, but two CDs went relatively unnoticed, as did a solo MP3 CD in 1998 called "Foster Vs. Foster".

Lead singer Edmund, who played Marlon Jackson's voice on the 1971–1973 ABC-TV Saturday morning cartoon series The Jackson 5ive, died of lung cancer in Richmond, Virginia, on March 11, 2004, at age 47. In 2007, Pat shared lead on the Larry O. Williams gospel duet, "Thank You". In the December 10, 2007 issue of Jet magazine the Sylvers were featured in the "Where Are They Now?" segment. In early 2008, a few siblings did an interview with Damien Maurice on his show Just Chillin''' with KPOO-FM in San Francisco. Both a Jet article and the radio interview hinted at the possibility of new Sylvers music in the near future.

During the summer of 2011, the Sylvers were featured on the TV One hit series, Unsung.  Leon, James, Charmaine, Angie and Pat—along with their mother Shirley—all appeared on the show to discuss their career successes and aftermath. It was mentioned that both Foster and Ricky had been incarcerated at the time of taping for parole violations. However, after the release of Foster, he and his sisters Angie and Pat made a television appearance on The Cindy Davis Show'' to discuss the politics of the music industry, and more.

Discography

Studio albums

Compilation albums

Singles

References

External links
The Sylvers at Yahoo! Music
Larry O. Williams' MySpace page

American dance music groups
African-American musical groups
20th-century African-American singers
American disco groups
Family musical groups
American soul musical groups
Musical groups from Los Angeles
Capitol Records artists
SOLAR Records artists
People from Watts, Los Angeles
Musical groups from California
1971 establishments in California
1985 disestablishments in California